is a 2015 video game in the Langrisser series.

The game takes place in a flooded world and the story's protagonist is a man with the Sacred Sword Langrisser, looking to reunite himself with a childhood friend, while fighting the empire's army. The battle system is the same as known from other Langrisser titles, but with 10-on-10 battles fought by super-deformed 3D characters serving as units. The units consist of Infantry, Cavalry, and Archers.

Music 
The game's music has been written by series regular Noriyuki Iwadare. Okui Masami sung the theme song .

Reception

Sales 
Re:Incarnation Tensei launched in Japan with 9,300 physical copies sold.

References

External links 
 

2015 video games
Nintendo 3DS games
Nintendo 3DS-only games
Nintendo 3DS eShop games
Tactical role-playing video games
Video games developed in Japan
Video games scored by Noriyuki Iwadare
Re:Incarnation Tensei
Single-player video games